Sehar (English: The morning) is a 2005 Indian crime drama film directed by Kabeer Kaushik, starring Arshad Warsi and Mahima Chaudhry, Sushant Singh and Pankaj Kapur. The film depicts organized crime in the state of Uttar Pradesh, India, and how the State Police worked to tackle it. It shows the turbulent journey of Ajay Kumar, a newly appointed 31-year-old SSP of Lucknow, played by Arshad Warsi, instrumental in bringing together a group of committed police officers under the aegis of Special Task Force.

The film is loosely based on the encounter of Shri Prakash Shukla, who was eliminated by the newly formed Special Task Force of the Uttar Pradesh Police.

Plot
The film begins with Professor Tiwari being interviewed about police encounters and bids to eradicate organised crime from Lucknow and its surrounding areas. It then showcases Ajay Kumar. Since he was young, Ajay has been traumatised by the death of his army officer father, who killed himself when accused of being a deserter, leaving his widow Prabha to bring up Ajay on her own. Ajay studies hard and successfully becomes an Indian Police Service officer with the title of Senior Superintendent of Police of Lucknow. Due to his honesty, he gets transferred to various states in India, around 14 times in eight years. At his new posting in Uttar Pradesh, he comes to terms with a new criminal boss and ruthless killer, Gajraj Singh. Meanwhile, he falls in love with his childhood friend Anamika Kant, with his mother subsequently deciding to get them married. Ajay engineers the setting up of a Special Task Force to deal with Gajraj. However, he also runs into problems as Gajraj is politically well-connected. Gajraj continues to elude the Task Force, using more modern technology such as the use of cell phones. But the Task Force recovers and is able to monitor Gajraj's cell phones with the help of Prof. Tiwari. They find out that Gajraj is planning to contest the elections and if he wins, no police officer of any rank, even the Task Force, would then dare to arrest him or even consider him a suspect, which may well result in the Task Force being mere paper tigers. They have a final confrontation inside a train which leaves from Hazrat Nizamuddin railway station. All the officers in the Task Force as well as members of Gajraj's gang kill each other in the fight, leaving Prof. Tiwari as the only witness.

Cast
Arshad Warsi as SSP Ajay Kumar
Mahima Chaudhry as Anamika Kant
Sushant Singh as Gajraj Singh
Pankaj Kapur as Professor Bhole Shankar Tiwari
Suhasini Mulay as Prabha Kumar
Rajendra Gupta as ADG (Law and Order) Arun Kapoor
Naved Aslam as Inspector Joginder Singh Solanki
Surendra Pal as Ramnath Mishra
Ravi Jhankal as Dwivedi, Mishra's Secretary
Rajendra Sethi as Satyapal Mehra, Builder
Ghanshyam Garg as Sub Inspector Baidyanath Mishra
Ujjwal Chopra as Inspector Sayyed
Vishnu Sharma as Chief Minister Raghuvir Singh
Kali Prasad Mukherjee as Rituraj/ Hemraj Chaudhary
Vikram Sahu as Hariprasad Singh, CM's friend
Vivek k. Rawat as Qaasim.

Music
All the songs were composed by Daniel B George, all lyrics were written by Nilanjana Kishore and Swanand Kirkire.

"Nakhredaar Banno Aae Piya" – Shubha Mudgal
"Dil To Hai Bezubaan" – Adnan Sami
"Sapno Ka Sehar Ho" – Alka Yagnik
"Faiz" (Sehar) – Pankaj Kapur
"Palke Jhukao Na" (force) – Adnan Sami, Alka Yagnik
"Palke Jhukao Na" (sacrifice)  – Adnan Sami, Alka Yagnik
"Palken Jhukao Na" (Duet) – Meenal Jain, Swanand Kirkire
"Prayer" -Swanand Kirkire

Critical reception
Namrata Joshi of Outlook India gave the film 3 out of 4, writing "It's a film that left me flummoxed. It's engrossing, well-made, a good first effort. But what do I make of its message? That you can't escape bloodshed? That taking to arms is the only way out in a decaying society? That unbridled machismo is the way to cleanse the corrupt system?" She also mentioned the film in her book ″Reel India: Cinema Off the Beaten Track″, stating ″Sehar succeeds in creating an authentic feel of the city [Lucknow] and state [Uttar Pradesh] as they are today, a virtual dystopia where things rarely function smoothly and law and order are flouted too often for comfort. It is vital, throbbing, real.″

Conversely, Taran Adarsh of IndiaFM gave the film 1 star out of 5, writing "On the whole, SEHAR is a dull and dry subject that will appeal to a very thin segment of moviegoers."

Rediff.com listed the film in ″Bollywood's Best Cop Films″ in 2009, stating ″This gritty cop drama from director Kabeer Kaushik features Arshad Warsi as an IPS officer posted in Lucknow. Warsi delivers a stellar performance and the film is one of the better police portrayals in recent cinema.″

See also 
Rangbaaz – Web series based on same encounter.

References

External links
 

2005 films
2000s Hindi-language films
Films set in Uttar Pradesh
Films set in Lucknow
Films about organised crime in India
Indian films based on actual events
Indian crime drama films
Indian police films
Fictional portrayals of the Uttar Pradesh Police